Eot or EOT may refer to:

Science 
 Equation of time
 Extraordinary optical transmission

Technology 
 Electric overhead traveling crane
 Embedded OpenType, a font file format
 End-of-tape, a marker indicating the end of a magnetic tape
 End-of-Transmission character, a transmission control character
 Equivalent oxide thickness, of a semiconductor
 Eyes of Things, a computer vision project

Transport 
 End-of-train device
 Engine order telegraph, a ship or submarine's speed control
 Massachusetts Executive Office of Transportation

Other uses 
 Employee ownership trust
 Eot (island), in Micronesia
 Eotile language
 Greek National Tourism Organization